Grey Lake is a glacially fed lake in Torres del Paine National Park, southern Chile.

Gallery

References

External links

Grey
Lakes of Magallanes Region
Glacial lakes of Chile
Torres del Paine National Park